Hyparpax perophoroides, the red-lined yellow prominent or lilac moth, is a species of moth in the family Notodontidae (the prominents). It was first described by Strecker in 1876 and it is found in North America.

The MONA or Hodges number for Hyparpax perophoroides is 8026.

References

Further reading

 
 
 

Notodontidae
Articles created by Qbugbot
Moths described in 1876